Otostigmus tuberculatus is a species of centipede in the Scolopendridae family. It is endemic to Australia and was first described in 1878 by E. Köhlrausch.

Distribution
The species occurs in northern and eastern coastal Queensland.

Behaviour
The centipedes are solitary terrestrial predators that inhabit plant litter, soil and rotting wood.

References

 

 
tuberculatus
Centipedes of Australia
Fauna of Queensland
Animals described in 1878